Mount Mitchell (Aboriginal: Cooyinnirra), is a twin-peaked volcanic mountain with an elevation above sea level of , located in the Main Range, is about  west of Brisbane, Queensland, Australia and immediately south of Cunninghams Gap.

Features and history
The peak to the south of the gap was named by Allan Cunningham in 1828 and today is part of the Main Range National Park. Cunningham named the mountain after the Surveyor-General, Thomas Mitchell.

To the north of Cunninghams Gap is Mount Cordeaux, while Spicers Peak is located a small distance to the south east.

A trail, classified as grade 4, winds  up to the main summit which offers some great views. From the peak on a clear day the tallest buildings in Brisbane can be seen, as can the D'Aguilar Range, Teviot Range, Fassifern Valley and many other parts of the Scenic Rim.  At the top of mountain there are sheer cliff edges.

Gallery

See also

List of mountains of Australia

References

Mitchell
Main Range National Park
Scenic Rim Region